WTPC-TV (channel 21) is a religious television station licensed to Virginia Beach, Virginia, United States, serving the Hampton Roads area as an owned-and-operated station of the Trinity Broadcasting Network (TBN). The station's transmitter is located in Suffolk, Virginia.

History

The station signed on March 26, 2006 as WHRE. It was originally owned by Copeland Channel 21, LLC, but has always been programmed by TBN. TBN filed to purchase the station outright in May 2010. WHRE added the -TV suffix on August 26, 2010. The call letters were changed to WTPC-TV on November 15, 2010.

Technical information

Subchannels

Analog-to-digital conversion
WTPC-TV (as WHRE) shut down its analog signal, over UHF channel 21, on February 17, 2009, and "flash-cut" its digital signal into operation to VHF channel 7. Because it was granted an original construction permit after the FCC finalized the DTV allotment plan on April 21, 1997. The station did not receive a companion channel for a digital television station, using PSIP to display WTPC-TV's virtual channel as 21 on digital television receivers.

References

External links 
TBN official website

Trinity Broadcasting Network affiliates
Television channels and stations established in 2006
2006 establishments in Virginia
TPC-TV
Mass media in Virginia Beach, Virginia